Alexander is an unincorporated community in Upshur County, West Virginia, United States. The coal hauling Beech Mountain Railroad (BEEM) also runs through and interchanges with the Appalachian and Ohio Railroad (A&O) in Alexander. 

The community was named after John M. Alexander, a businessperson in the local lumber industry.

References

Unincorporated communities in Upshur County, West Virginia
Unincorporated communities in West Virginia